Ammermann is a German surname. Notable people with the surname include:

Jaan Ammermann (1889–?), Estonian politician
Max Ammermann (1878–?), German rower
Otto Ammermann (born 1932), German equestrian

See also
Ammerman

German-language surnames